Anthonie (or Antonius) Heinsius (23 November 1641, Delft – 3 August 1720, The Hague) was a Dutch statesman who served as Grand Pensionary of Holland from 1689 to his death in 1720.

Life 
Heinsius was born at Delft on 23 November 1641, son of a wealthy merchant and patrician.

In 1679 he became pensionary for Delft in the States of Holland and in 1687 he became a member of the board of the Delft chamber of the Dutch East India Company (VOC).

In 1682 he was appointed special negotiator to France by stadholder William III of Orange. His mission was to see if anything could be done about the occupation of the Principality of Orange by Louis XIV. The mission was a failure but he made a favourable impression on William III.

Grand Pensionary 
He became Grand Pensionary of the States of Holland, and thereby the most powerful man in the Estates-General of the Netherlands, on 27 May 1689, when William III became king of England and had to move to London. He was the confidant and correspondent of William, who left the guidance of Dutch affairs largely in his hands.

Heinsius was a tough negotiator and one of the greatest and most obstinate opponents of the expansionist policies of France.

He was one of the driving forces behind the anti-France coalitions of the Nine Years' War (1688–97) and the War of the Spanish Succession (1701–14). After the death of William III in 1702, Heinsius' hold on the States General diminished, but he remained Grand Pensionary of Holland until his own death in 1720.

Sources

 The Correspondence of Anthonie Heinsius, 1702-1720, edited by A. J. Veenendaal, Jr.
 [https://web.archive.org/web/20081002230545/http://www.inghist.nl/Instituut/Publicatie/696  Antonie Heinsius and the Dutch Republic], edited by J. A. F. de Jongste and A. J. Veenendaal, Jr.
 Heinsius' Correspondence in the Nationaal Archief, The Hague, 36.3 metres.

External links 
 

1640 births
1720 deaths
Burials at the Oude Kerk, Delft
Dutch States Party politicians
Grand Pensionaries
People from Delft
17th-century Dutch politicians